A month's mind is a requiem mass celebrated about one month after a person's death, in memory of the deceased.

In medieval and later England, it was a service and feast held one month after the death of anyone in his or her memory. Bede speaks of the day as commemorationis dies. These "minding days" were of great antiquity, and were survivals of the Norse minne, or ceremonial drinking to the dead.

"Minnying Days," says Blount, "from the Saxon Lemynde, days which our ancestors called their monthes mind, their Year's mind and the like, being the days whereon their souls (after their deaths) were had in special remembrance, and some office or obsequies said for them, as Obits, Dirges." The phrase is still used in Lancashire. 

It is still an almost universal practice in Ireland (for Roman Catholics) for the family of the deceased and close friends to attend mass and take a meal together on the occasion of the month's mind.

Elaborate instructions for the conduct of the commemorative service were often left in wills. Thus, one Thomas Windsor (who died in 1479) orders that "on my moneth's minde there be a hundred children within the age of sixteen years, to say for my soul," and candles were to be burned before the rood (cross) in the parish church and twenty priests were to be paid by his executors to sing Placebo, Dirige, and other songs. In the correspondence of Thomas, Lord Cromwell, one in 1536 is mentioned at which a hundred priests took part in the requiem mass. Commemorative sermons were usually preached, the earliest printed example being one delivered by John Fisher, bishop of Rochester, on Margaret, countess of Richmond and Derby, in 1509.

References

Mass in the Catholic Church
Death customs
Christianity in medieval England
Tudor England